Offertorium may refer to:

 Offertorium (Gubaidulina), a concerto for violin and orchestra composed by Sofia Gubaidulina (an instrumental offertorium.)
 Latin for Offertory, where the alms of a congregation are collected in church, or at any religious service.
 A musical setting of the offertory text (see Propers.)